Sarıcasu, Kumluca is a village in the District of Kumluca, Antalya Province, Turkey.

References

Villages in Kumluca District